Hel Peninsula (or Putziger Nehrung) is a  sand bar peninsula in northern Poland separating the Bay of Puck from the open Baltic Sea. It is located in Puck County of the Pomeranian Voivodeship.

Name 
The name of the peninsula might come from either the Old Polish word hyl/hel, meaning "empty or exposed place," or the Germanic word heel, which is derived from the form of the peninsula and the fact that the area was first settled by the Goths, an East Germanic tribe.

Geography 
Since the peninsula was formed entirely of sand, it is frequently turned into an island by winter storms. Until the 17th century, the peninsula was a chain of islands that formed a strip of land only in the summer.

A road and a railroad run along the peninsula from the mainland to the town at the furthest point, Hel, a popular tourist destination. Other towns, ports, and tourist resorts are Jurata, Jastarnia, Kuźnica, Chałupy, and Władysławowo.

Bus transport on peninsula consists of only one route, the 666.

Military importance 
The Hel (German: Hela) Peninsula was part of Prussia and then Germany from 1772 to 1919. After the peninsula became part of the Second Polish Republic after World War I, it acquired considerable military significance (Polish Corridor) and was turned into a fortified region, with a garrison of about 3,000. In the course of the Battle of Hel in 1939, Polish forces dynamited the peninsula at one point and turned it into an island.

During the years of German occupation of Poland (1939–1945), Hel's defenses were further expanded, and a battery of three 40.6 cm SK C/34 gun was constructed, but the guns were soon moved to the Atlantic Wall in occupied France. Hel peninsula remained in German hands until the end of World War II, when the defending forces surrendered on 14 May 1945, six days after Germany capitulated.

After the war, when the peninsula again became part of Poland, it continued to have military significance, with much of its area reserved for military use. Additional gun batteries were built in the 1940s and the 1950s. Many of the fortifications and batteries are open to tourists today, but some areas of the peninsula still belong to the Polish Armed Forces.

Gallery

See also 
 Hel Fortified Area
 Westerplatte
 Hel lighthouse

References 

Spits of the Baltic Sea
Peninsulas of Poland